Deportivo Mongomo is an Equatorial Guinean football club based in the city of Mongomo. They participate in the Equatoguinean Premier League, and won that league in 1980, 1997, 2010 and 2022.

Achievements
Equatoguinean Premier League: 4
1980, 1997, 2010, 2021–22.

Equatoguinean Cup: 1
2015

Performance in CAF competitions
CAF Champions League: 1 appearance
2011 – Preliminary Round

Notable players

References

External links
Soccerway profile
ZeroZeroFootball profile

Mongomo
Football clubs in Equatorial Guinea